Jaime Isuardi Fernández (born 2 February 1992) is a Spanish footballer who plays for Club Portugalete as a forward.

Club career
Isuardi was born in Santander, Cantabria. A product of local giants Racing de Santander's youth system, he made his first-team – and La Liga – debut on 1 May 2012, playing 11 minutes in a 1–1 away draw against Getafe CF. He spent the vast majority of his spell registered with the B-side, however.

On 30 May 2013, Isuardi signed for Real Betis, being assigned to the reserves in Tercera División. On 20 January 2015, he moved to another reserve team, Real Zaragoza B.

References

External links

1992 births
Living people
Spanish footballers
Footballers from Santander, Spain
Association football forwards
La Liga players
Segunda División players
Segunda División B players
Tercera División players
Rayo Cantabria players
Racing de Santander players
Betis Deportivo Balompié footballers
Real Zaragoza B players
CD San Roque de Lepe footballers
CD Tropezón players
Écija Balompié players
Club Portugalete players